Khalid Ajab (born 28 July 1986) is a Kuwaiti footballer who is a forward for the Kuwaiti Premier League club Al Kuwait.

Personal life
Khalid brothers, Ahmad and Faisal, was also footballers.

International goals

References

1986 births
Living people
Kuwaiti footballers
Footballers at the 2010 Asian Games
Sportspeople from Kuwait City
Association football forwards
Asian Games competitors for Kuwait
Kuwait international footballers
Al-Sahel SC (Kuwait) players
Al Jahra SC players
Al Salmiya SC players
Qadsia SC players
Kuwait Premier League players